Las viudas del cha-cha-cha is a 1955 Mexican Musical Comedy directed by Miguel M. Delgado.

Cast
 Amalia Aguilar
 Raúl Martínez
 Chula Prieto
 Andrés Soler
 Eduardo Alcaraz
 León Barroso
 María Herrero
 Otilia Larrañaga

External links

1955 films
Films directed by Miguel M. Delgado
Mexican black-and-white films
Rumberas films
1950s Spanish-language films
Mexican musical comedy films
1955 musical comedy films
1950s Mexican films